Luke Partington (born 5 March 1997) is a former professional Australian rules footballer who played for the West Coast Eagles in the Australian Football League (AFL). He was drafted by West Coast with their first selection and twenty-eighth overall in the 2015 national draft.

He tied for the best and fairest in 2018 at East Perth, West Coast's West Australian Football League affiliate at the time, but was delisted by West Coast at the end of the 2018 season. For the 2019 season, Partington would move back to South Australia and join the Glenelg Tigers in the South Australian National Football League. He would cap off his 2019 season by winning the league's best and fairest award, the Magarey Medal. In 2021 he was selected to represent South Australian against Western Australian in their interstate match.

References

External links

1997 births
Living people
West Coast Eagles players
Norwood Football Club players
East Perth Football Club players
Australian rules footballers from South Australia
People educated at Immanuel College, Adelaide